

Jach'a Quta (Aymara jach'a big, quta lake, "big lake", also spelled Jachcha Kkota) is a lake in Bolivia located in the La Paz Department, Sud Yungas Province, Yanacachi Municipality, north-west of the mountain Mururata. It lies south-east of the mountain Wanakuni and the lakes Warawarani and Jisk'a Warawarani at the mountain Thakis Uma. One of the smaller lakes near Jach'a Quta is named Jisk'a Quta ("small lake", Jiskha Kkota). It is situated north-east of Jach'a Quta.

References 

Lakes of La Paz Department (Bolivia)